The 2011 Misano Superbike World Championship round was the sixth round of the 2011 Superbike World Championship. It took place on the weekend of June 10–12, 2011 at the Misano Adriatico circuit in Misano Adriatico, Italy.

Results

Superbike race 1 classification

Superbike race 2 classification

Supersport race classification

Misano Round
Misano Superbike